Matthew Sale (born 2 February 1975) is a New Zealand former cricketer. He played two first-class matches for Otago in 1997/98.

See also
 List of Otago representative cricketers

References

External links
 

1975 births
Living people
New Zealand cricketers
Otago cricketers
Cricketers from Auckland